Es war einmal (Once upon a time) is a fairy-tale opera in a prologue and three acts by the Austrian composer Alexander von Zemlinsky, composed during 1897-99. The libretto, an adaptation of Marie von Borch's German translation of the fairy-tale play Der var engang by the Danish author Holger Drachmann, was written by Maximilian Singer.

Performance history
The opera was first performed on 22 January 1900 at the Vienna State Opera conducted by Gustav Mahler with Selma Kurz and Erik Schmedes in the principal roles. Mahler insisted on numerous changes during rehearsals: the closing portion of Act One was reworked and several cuts implemented, including the central section of the Prelude. The successful premiere resulted in a run of twelve performances. Zemlinsky made further revisions in 1912. Revivals followed in Mannheim in May of that year (with Zemlinsky's former pupil Artur Bodanzky conducting), and in October at the Neues Deutsches Theater in Prague, under the composer's direction.

Roles

Instrumentation

 3 flutes (2nd and 3rd doubling piccolo), 3 oboes (3rd doubling cor anglais), 2 clarinets in B-flat/A, bass clarinet, 3 bassoons (3rd ad lib);
 4 horns, 3 trumpets, 3 trombones, bass tuba;
 timpani, percussion (cymbals, bass drum, side drum, triangle, glockenspiel), 2 harps; 
 strings
offstage: 2 piccolos, 2 horns, 4 trumpets, trombone, tambourine, side drums, solo violin

Recordings
In 1990 the German record label Capriccio released the world premiere recording: a June 1987 recording from Danish Radio with Hans Graf conducting the Danish National Radio Symphony Orchestra and Chorus. The principal roles were sung by Eva Johansson (Princess), Kurt Westi (Prince), Per-Arne Wahlgren (Kaspar) and Aage Haugland (King). This performance was the first since the Prague staging of 1912.

The original version of the Prelude, reinstating the 30-bar central section omitted in Mahler's performances, was recorded by the Czech Phlharmonic Orchestra conducted by Antony Beaumont in 2001.

References
Notes

Sources
 Batta, András, Opera - Komponisten, Werke, Interpreten (Könemann Verlagsgesellschaft mbH, 2000, Dutch translation)

Operas by Alexander Zemlinsky
1900 operas
German-language operas
Operas
Operas based on plays
Holger Drachmann